The 2002 Liga Indonesia Premier Division Final was a football match that was played on 7 July 2002 at Gelora Bung Karno Stadium in Jakarta. It was contested by Persita Tangerang and Petrokimia Putra to determine the winner of the 2002 Liga Indonesia Premier Division. Petrokimia Putra won the match 2–1 thanks to a golden goal from Yao Eloii. With the result, Petrokimia Putra claim their first-ever professional title.

Road to the final

Match details

References

External links
Liga Indonesia Premier Division standings

2002